Retford United Football Club (also known as the Badgers) are an English football club based at Cannon Park in Retford, Nottinghamshire. They currently play in the Central Midlands Football League.

History

The club was founded in 1987 by Retfordian Brian Jackson to give the town a senior club after Retford Town had gone out of business. The club's inaugural season was in the Gainsborough & District League which was successful so it applied to join the Notts Football Alliance the following season and competed in that league up until 2001, when local business man Dean Vivians financial support, built the club house, ground, floodlights , everything necessary to rise up the football pyramid and they joined the Central Midlands League. Promotion after promotion followed and Just three years passed before another milestone was reached and the club joined the Northern Counties East League.

The success continued, finishing as runners-up in the Northern Counties East League Division One in 2005–06, gaining promotion to the Premier Division, which they won at their first attempt. They were then promoted to the Northern Premier League Division One South, which they won two years running, gaining promotion to the Premier Division in 2009. In all, between 2000 and 2009, they won a total of six championships, of various leagues and divisions, in nine seasons.

However, at the end of the 2010–11 season they finished bottom and were relegated to the Northern Premier League Division One South. Due to financial constraints, the club opted to resign from the Northern Premier League and to compete in the Northern Counties East League Premier Division where they again won the title in the 2011/12 season but they rejected promotion opting instead to continue in NCEL.

Retford reached the fifth round (last 16) of the FA Vase in the 2006–07 season, while their best run in the FA Cup has consisted of one appearance in the fourth qualifying round, in the 2008–09 season, where they were defeated 3–1 by Alfreton Town. Their first season in the FA Trophy in 2007–08 took them to the first round where they were defeated 5–2 by Histon.
Retford were relegated from the 1st division of the NCEL at the end of season 2017-2018 and now play in the Central Midlands North League. The club has been taken over by the ONECALL insurance group and is now an Ltd Company. ONECALL have refurbished the clubhouse, changing rooms and outside areas of the ground. The current Manager is Liam Kay.

Origins and youth structure

When Retford United was formed in 1987 it consisted of a senior team in the Gainsborough & District League and an under 10 youth team. Looking forward the aim was to get the senior team climbing the football league pyramid, and at youth level add a new team at the youngest age group until the club was competing at every level up to the seniors. Also girls football was introduced in the later years and still continues. The first-ever youth games were played on the Jenkins Sports Ground on Thrumpton Lane.

The Junior Section of the club now operate independently at Oaklands as Retford United Junior F.C.

The first senior games were played on the council-owned Goosemoor for a short period before moving to Oaklands and eventually to Cannon Park on Leverton Road at the start of the new millennium.

Honours 
Northern Premier League
Division One South Champions 2008–09 (Promoted to Premier Division)
Division One South Champions 2007–08 (Could not be promoted to Premier Division after failing a ground inspection)
Challenge Cup Runners-up 2009–10
Chairman's Cup Winners 2007–08
Northern Counties East League
Premier Division Champions 2006–07, 2011–12
Division One Runners-up 2005–06
Wilkinson Sword Trophy Winners 2005–06
President's Cup Winners 2006–07
Central Midlands Football League
Supreme Division Champions 2003–04
League Cup Winners 2003–04
Trophy Winners 2005–06
Floodlit Cup Winners 2003–04
Nottinghamshire FA Senior Cup
Winners 2008–09

Records
FA Cup
Fourth Qualifying Round 2008–09
FA Trophy
First Round 2007–08
FA Vase
Fifth Round 2006–07

References

External links 
Retford United website

 
Football clubs in England
Retford
Northern Counties East Football League
1987 establishments in England
Association football clubs established in 1987
Central Midlands Football League